Brazell Field at GCU Ballpark is a college baseball stadium on the campus of Grand Canyon University in Phoenix, Arizona.  It hosts the Grand Canyon Antelopes of the Western Athletic Conference.

The field is named for Dr. Dave Brazell, considered to be "the founder and developer of Canyon baseball." As the coach of the Lopes for 28 seasons, Brazell put together an impressive record of 728-385-8.

The playing surface is composed complete of natural grass, save for infield foul territory where AstroTurf was installed in 2018. An inning-by-inning digital scoreboard is visible in left-center field.

History

Field established
In 1962, the program's facility was relocated from a more centralized location on the campus to the west end with the left field fence running parallel to 35th Avenue. The layout of the field remains largely unchanged from its 1962 debut.

In 1970, the field was named Brazell Field.

Brazell Stadium era
With the addition of bleacher seating, the facility transitioned from Brazell Field to Brazell Stadium in 1987.

Gold-colored bleachers wrapped around the home plate area, extending to each team's dugouts on either side. The stadium featured lights, making night games possible.

In the off-season prior to the 2014 baseball season, large shades were added over the stands. The official capacity for the venue was 1,500.

Improvements over the years at Brazell Stadium included replacement of wood bleachers, backstop improvements and the awning.

On February 21, 2014, the Grand Canyon Antelopes baseball team hosted the inaugural game in which the Lopes were a full member of the WAC Conference.  The Lopes defeated the Hofstra Pride in convincing 8–1 fashion behind a complete game from starting pitcher Jorge Perez.

After spending four seasons in Division I for baseball only from 1995–1998, the entire athletic department made the jump to NCAA Division I for the fall of 2013. Since the return to Division I for the baseball program, the Lopes boasted a 35–13 record at Brazell Stadium through the 2015 season.

Birth of GCU Ballpark
In August 2016, the university announced its 10-in-2 initiative to build 10 new athletic facilities in two years to coincide with the final stages of GCU's full Division I membership. Among these 10 facilities was a new baseball stadium, later named GCU Ballpark. The new name of the facility was announced as Brazell Field at GCU Ballpark on January 22, 2018.

Demolition of the former stadium including the press box, grandstands, and dugouts began on May 22, 2017, following the conclusion of the home portion of the team's schedule.

The new facility delivers several new amenities for the program: chairback seating for over 3,000 fans, a multi-room press box, an upgraded sound system, an entertainment patio in right field, berm seating for fans in right field, an on-site concession stand and a team store.

See also
 List of NCAA Division I baseball venues

References

External links

 GCU Baseball Website

Grand Canyon Antelopes baseball
College baseball venues in the United States
Baseball venues in Arizona
1962 establishments in Arizona
Sports venues completed in 1962